Hassabu Mohamed Abdalrahman (also known as Hassabu Mohamed Abdul-Rahman) served as the Second Vice President of Sudan from 7 December 2013 to 10 September 2018.

Abdalrahman is from South Darfur. He was previously the chief of Sudan's Humanitarian Aid Commission.

References

Living people
Year of birth missing (living people)
Vice presidents of Sudan
Place of birth missing (living people)
National Congress Party (Sudan) politicians
People from South Darfur